Gregoire Lake 176A is an Indian reserve of the Fort McMurray First Nation in Alberta, located within the Regional Municipality of Wood Buffalo. In the 2016 Canadian Census, it recorded a population of 130 living in 43 of its 49 total private dwellings.

References

Regional Municipality of Wood Buffalo
Indian reserves in Alberta